Ogre, Ogre is the fifth book of the Xanth series by Piers Anthony.

Plot introduction
Smash the half-ogre (offspring of Crunch the ogre and a human Curse Fiend acting like an ogre) goes to see the Good Magician Humfrey to get his question answered, although he doesn't know what his question is. The magician's answer: Travel to the Ancestral Ogres to find what you seek.  His payment is to guard Tandy, a half-nymph, for one year.

They travel about the magical land of Xanth, and Smash acquires other young women who travel with him and whom he protects.  Along the way, he is infected with the Eye Queue vine, which makes him intelligent (although actually invoking his human half) making him distressed as ogres are not supposed to be smart in any way. As he tries to find an antidote to his intelligence, he undergoes several adventures; saving Tandy from the dream realm in a plant called a hypnogourd and smashing the Gap Dragon. Soon he finds matches and finds solutions to all of the women, who leave one by one.

Plot summary

The book starts off with Tandy the half-nymph being sexually harassed by the nasty demon Fiant while trying to sleep. She has the talent of throwing tantrums that can stun or destroy, but her talent is ineffective against the demon, so she decides to visit her father Crombie at Castle Roogna to see if he can help. Having no means of travel, however, she decides to catch a night mare to take her there. She succeeds, at the price of being battered, except the mare takes her to the Good Magician's castle instead, where she is admitted without challenges due to the difficulties she went through riding the mare.

Cut to a year later, we find Smash the half-ogre travelling to the Good Magician Humfrey seeking to solve a vague dissatisfaction about himself. Using the best of his ogre qualities (strength and naive stupidity), plus his clumsy knowledge of human customs, as well as the occasional bright flash of human intelligence, he navigates his way into the Magician's castle passing various obstacles such as a basilisk and a pond of firewater. Once Smash gains entrance, though, he is too stupid to formulate his question. Magician Humphrey gives him an answer anyway, telling him to travel to the Ancestral Ogres and take Tandy with him, and guard her.

On their travels, Smash and Tandy blunder into an Eye Queue vine, which embeds itself into Smash's head and provides him with human intelligence so he converses in the human way instead of spouting simple ogre rhymes. He soon discovers that the vine also helps give him good ideas, as not all the problems he and Tandy encounter can be bashed to pieces. After the vine, they encounter an assortment of females of various magical races, each needing to fulfill a personal quest including a dryad who needs to protect her tree from woodsmen, the wingless fairy John looking for her similarly incorrectly named counterpart to switch back, Centaur Chem, a longtime friend with the talent of magic mapping who wants to chart more of Xanth, Blythe Brassie who accidentally leaves her hypnogourd homeworld to come to the real Xanth, a mermaid looking for love, and others. Unfortunately also during their travels, Tandy gets trapped in the hypnogourd world and has her soul wrenched from her, though she is later freed by the others. Smash enters back into the gourd and forages a deal with the world's spokesperson (in the form of a coffin): Smash will give his soul to the gourd under a 90-day lien in exchange for Tandy's soul. He then has 90 days to find the dread Night Stallion, ruler of the gourd world, and negotiate to void the lien.

As the travels continue, each female does find what she is looking for, eventually, although Smash's strength saps out of him a little at a time as his soul is gradually recalled as the days pass. Smash makes periodic forays into the gourd world, with the help of a magical and infinite ball of string to mark his way, in search of the Night Stallion, overcoming various world challenges, most of which require both his ogre strength and human intelligence to solve. Finally, when only Chem and Tandy are left with Smash, they come upon the dread Elements region and face a flood in the water region that washes off the Eye Queue vine from Smash's head, right before they enter the most dangerous Void region. As they enter the void, they come to realize that they are trapped and must find a way to get out, which they can't do without Smash's useful intelligence. Smash, using the Void's properties, manages to get his illusion of intelligence back (though at this point it is no longer illusory), and enter the gourd one last time, where he finally finds the Night Stallion and faces new challenges that require all his newfound human intelligence as well as his ogre strength and stubbornness to overcome.

Once Smash conquers the Night Stallion's challenges and wins back his soul, he realizes his human side and falls in love with Tandy, putting his own soul in jeopardy again to save her, but through another deal ends up with only half a soul and half his ogre strength. He finally does arrive at the home of the Ancestral Ogres but notes how stupid and ugly they really are and decides he does not want to stay with them, though, when they threaten Tandy he commits to fighting to save her. After Tandy sacrifices her own soul mid-battle to save Smash (giving him full ogre strength) so he can defeat the ancestral ogres, Smash finally comes to true terms with his human side, even transforming himself into a human so he can make love to Tandy properly.

As Smash and Tandy journey home, they again run into Demon Fiant. As a man, Smash is no match for the demon, but manages to transform back to ogre form, and is able to defeat Fiant permanently, though again his human intelligence is needed to win this battle.

Characters
Smash
Tandy
Chem
Siren
John Fairy
Blythe
Imbri

References

 05
1982 American novels
Del Rey books